Waruntorn Paonil (born 23 February 1994), nicknamed Ink, also known by the stage name Ink Waruntorn, is a Thai singer, actress, and voice actress.

In 2006, she began her career with a role in a music video, before becoming a member of the pop group Chilli White Choc, which she left in 2009. In 2015, she returned as a solo artist and also took a lead role in the political romance film Snap. Her first solo single, "Insomnia", went number one on music charts in Thailand.

In 2020, she was given the Mnet Asian Music Award for Best Asian Artist. The following year, she started her voice acting career with the titular role in the animation The Legend of Hei.

Life

After completing her secondary education at Srinakharinwirot University Prasarnmit Demonstration School, Waruntorn became a student at the Musical Department of the Faculty of Fine and Applied Arts, Chulalongkorn University, where she majored in classical singing (opera). During her study at Chulalongkorn, she also served as the university drum major for the 70th Chula–Thammasat Traditional Football Match in 2015. She completed her study in 2016 and was conferred with a Bachelor of Arts in Music (Second-Class Honours). Before graduation, she held a one-hour solo opera concert called Senior Voice Recital at her university on 27 April 2016.

Career

In 2006, Waruntorn started her career at the age of 12 by starring in the music video of Four-Mod's "Dek Wunwai". In the same year, she became an artist under RS Music's Kamikaze. The following year, she debuted as a member of the girl group Chilli White Choc. She left the group in 2009, citing study reasons.

In 2015, she returned with a lead role in the political romance film Snap and became a solo artist under Boxx Music. The next year, she released her first single, "Insomnia". The song "Insomnia" went number one on the Cat Radio chart and the Fungjai chart and was listed as one of the Top 50 Thai Songs of the Year by JOOX.

She released her first extended play in 2017, called Bliss, containing all of the songs from her first five singles.

During her concert called Secret Between Us on 14 September 2019, she revealed to the audience that she was four days ago diagnosed with a "large, harmful uterine fibroid". After the concert, she received a surgical procedure and took a break for recuperation from 21 October to 22 November 2019.

In 2021, she started her voice acting career with the titular role in the Chinese animation The Legend of Hei, for which she also sang the theme song.

Filmography

Discography

Singles

Studio albums

Extended plays

OST songs

Other songs

Concerts

Awards and nominations

References

External links
 Waruntorn Paonil at Boxx Music 

1994 births
Living people
Waruntorn Paonil
Waruntorn Paonil
Waruntorn Paonil
Waruntorn Paonil
Waruntorn Paonil
Waruntorn Paonil